Hangsaman is a 1951 gothic novel by American author Shirley Jackson. The second of Jackson's published novels, Hangsaman is a bildungsroman centering on lonely college freshman Natalie Waite, who descends into madness after enrolling in a liberal arts college.

The novel takes its title from an old folk ballad. The official publisher's description of Hangsaman says the novel is “loosely based on the real-life disappearance of a Bennington College sophomore in 1946," referencing the case of Paula Jean Welden. At the time, Jackson was living in Bennington, Vermont, as her husband, Stanley Edgar Hyman, was employed at Bennington College, where Welden had been a student. However, Ruth Franklin's research for her 2016 biography of Jackson found no evidence the novel was inspired by Welden's disappearance. Jackson's text mixes satire with psychological elements as her protagonist spends half her time in an imaginary world.

Plot summary 
On the verge of leaving for college, Natalie Waite feels oppressed by the expectations of her pompous, overbearing father, who imposes his personality on her, and by her miserable, defeated mother, whom Natalie sees as an example of the unhappy future that awaits her if she does not escape from home. Natalie withdraws into elaborate fantasies where she is a proud, unbreakable criminal being grilled by a detective for her crimes. On the eve of Natalie's departure for college, she is invited to her first adult party, where she witnesses her parents and their drunken colleagues at their most contemptible. Natalie experiments with different identities among the party-goers and seems to successfully intrigue an older man, only to be led by him into the woods behind the family's home where he sexually assaults her. The following morning, Natalie convinces herself that the assault did not happen.

Natalie leaves for her all-female college, where she is determined to reinvent herself. Most of her fellow students are too superficial and self-absorbed to even notice Natalie, who finds an uncomfortable place at the fringe of a group of popular girls. Natalie is briefly attracted to her self-important English professor, who is the object of Natalie's friends' romantic schemes. Soon Natalie sees that the man has the same flaws as her own father, and that the professor's resentful wife resembles Natalie's own classmates. She resumes her fantasy life, imagining herself as an implacable giant that destroys the college and devours its residents.

Natalie hears rumors of an impish student named Tony who is both scorned and secretly admired for her lack of conventionality. Natalie is determined to find and befriend Tony, but Tony seeks her out first. Natalie becomes preoccupied with Tony. Together they embark on a series of eccentric adventures wherein they exercise their shared creativity, focusing on their own difference from—and superiority to—the people around them. Natalie's reputation suffers due to her strange new behavior, but for the first time in her life, she no longer cares how others perceive her, even as Tony lures her into increasingly dangerous situations.

On a stormy afternoon, Tony persuades Natalie to take a bus to an unfamiliar location miles away from the college. Tony guides her to a lake with a closed amusement park, and Natalie follows her into a small forest. In the fallen darkness, Natalie loses Tony and sits on a log to wait for her, in a scene which mirrors the setting where Natalie was violated the first time. When Tony reappears, Natalie says that she wants to go home. Now uncomfortable with their intimacy, Natalie sets off on her own. An older couple drive up and insist on giving her a ride. They tell her they have a daughter who is same age as Natalie; they discuss what might happen to a girl who is out alone, and those things that parents don't know about their children's lives. The couple drop her off at a bridge near her school. During Natalie's last conversation with her father, he had stated that a radical shift in perspective, such as having a suicidal frame of mind, was necessary for one to clearly see one's own worth.
Natalie climbs the rail of the bridge and hesitates. Finally, she turns back towards the college feeling powerful, unafraid, and grown up.

References in other media 
The 2020 film Shirley is a fictionalized account of the time in which Jackson was writing Hangsaman, depicting the novel's creation as being inspired both by the Welden disappearance and the life of a newly married couple boarding in the home of Jackson and her husband Stanley Hyman.

References

1951 American novels
American bildungsromans
American satirical novels
Novels by Shirley Jackson
Books by Shirley Jackson